Solonchak (Russian and Ukrainian: Солончак) is a Reference Soil Group of the World Reference Base for Soil Resources (WRB). It is a pale or grey soil type found in arid to subhumid, poorly drained conditions.  The word is Russian for "salt marsh" in turn from Russian sol (соль), "salt". Ukrainian folk word "солончак" in turn from Ukrainian "salty" (солоний) + "чак"—suffix; designation of an object that has the property. A village with the name Solonchaky exists in Ukraine.

See also
Chott
Solonetz
Takir
Salt pan
Sor (geomorphology)

References 
 IUSS Working Group WRB: World Reference Base for Soil Resources, fourth edition. International Union of Soil Sciences, Vienna 2022. .

Further reading
 W. Zech, P. Schad, G. Hintermaier-Erhard: Soils of the World. Springer, Berlin 2022, Chapter 8.3.5.

External links 
 profile photos (with classification) WRB homepage
 profile photos (with classification) IUSS World of Soils

Pedology
Types of soil